Lacto-N-biosidase is an enzyme with systematic name oligosaccharide lacto-N-biosylhydrolase. This enzyme catalyses the following chemical reaction

 (1) beta-D-Gal-(1->3)-beta-D-GlcNAc-(1->3)-beta-D-Gal-(1->4)-D-Glc + H2O  beta-D-Gal-(1->3)-D-GlcNAc + beta-D-Gal-(1->4)-D-Glc
 (2) lacto-N-tetraose + H2O  lacto-N-biose + lactose

The enzyme from Streptomyces specifically hydrolyses the terminal lacto-N-biosyl residue (beta-D-Gal-(1->3)-D-GlcNAc) from the non-reducing end of oligosaccharides with the structure beta-D-Gal-(1->3)-beta-D-GlcNAc-(1->3)-beta-D-Gal-(1->R).

References

External links 
 

EC 3.2.1